Traveller's Rest is a historic house in Natchez, Mississippi, USA. It has been listed on the National Register of Historic Places since May 3, 1984.

References

Houses on the National Register of Historic Places in Mississippi
Houses completed in 1835
Houses in Adams County, Mississippi